Zenkerella perplexa is a species of plant in the family Fabaceae. It is found only in Tanzania, where it is endemic to the Eastern Arc forests.

References

Detarioideae
Flora of Tanzania
Vulnerable plants
Taxonomy articles created by Polbot